Mack Gordon (born Morris Gittler; June 21, 1904 – February 28, 1959) was an American composer and lyricist for the stage and film. He was nominated for the best original song Oscar nine times in 11 years, including five consecutive years between 1940 and 1944, and won the award once, for "You'll Never Know". That song has proved among his most enduring, and remains popular in films and television commercials to this day. "At Last" is another of his best-known songs.

Biography
Gordon was born in Grodno, then part of the Russian Empire. He emigrated with his mother and older brother to New York City in May 1907; the ship they sailed on was the S/S Bremen; their destination was to his father in Guttenberg, New Jersey. Gordon appeared in vaudeville as an actor and singer in the late 1920s and early 1930s, but his songwriting talents were always paramount. He formed a partnership with English pianist Harry Revel, that lasted throughout the 1930s. In the 1940s he worked with a string of other composers including Harry Warren.

The Internet Movie Database gives credit to Gordon for songs used in the soundtrack of over 100 films, with Gordon writing specifically for at least 50 of them. His catalogue includes more than 120 songs sung by some of the world's most famous and talented performers such as Frank Sinatra, Nat King Cole, Dean Martin, Sammy Davis Jr., Etta James, Glenn Miller, Barbra Streisand, Mel Tormé, Christina Aguilera and many more. His close friendship with many of his artists (such as Frank Sinatra and the Rat Pack) and his ability to write lyrics that were timeless, allowed him to become one of the most famous members of the world of music and a legendary lyricist. His exhibit in the Songwriters Hall of Fame says he was "arguably one of the most successful lyricists to write for the screen".

Gordon died in 1959. He is entombed in the Corridor of Immortality at Home of Peace Cemetery in Los Angeles, California.

Selected songs
 
"A Lady Loves"
"A Star Fell Out of Heaven"
"A Tree Was a Tree"
"All About Love"
"An Old Straw Hat"
"An Orchid to You"
"At Last"
"Baby, Won't You Say You Love Me"
"Chattanooga Choo-Choo"  
"Cigarettes, Cigars"
"Danger, Love at Work"
"Did You Ever See a Dream Walking?"
"Doin' the Uptown Lowdown"
"Down Argentine Way"
"From the Top of Your Head to the Tip of Your Toes"
"Goodnight My Love"
"Help Yourself to Happiness"
"I Can't Begin to Tell You"
"I Feel Like a Feather in the Breeze"
"I Had the Craziest Dream"
"I Played Fiddle for the Czar"
"I'm Making Believe"
"I've Got a Date With a Dream"
"I've Got a Gal in Kalamazoo"
"If You Feel Like Singing, Sing"
"In Old Chicago"
"It Happened In Sun Valley"
"It Happens Every Spring"
"It Was a Night in June"
"It's Swell of You"
"Listen to the German Band"
"Lookie, Lookie, Lookie, Here Comes Cookie"
"Love Thy Neighbor"
"Mam'selle"
"May I?"
"My Heart is an Open Book"
"My Heart Tells Me"
"Never in a Million Years"
"On the Boardwalk at Atlantic City"
"Once in a Blue Moon"
"Once Too Often"
"Paris in the Spring"
"Serenade in Blue"
"She Reminds Me of You"
"Somebody Soon"
"Somewhere in the Night"
"Stay As Sweet As You Are"
"Sunny Southern Smile"
"Takes Two to Make a Bargain"
"Thanks for Everything"
"The More I See You"
"There Will Never Be Another You"
"There's a Lull in My Life"
"Through a Long and Sleepless Night" 
"Time on My Hands"
"Underneath the Harlem Moon"
"What Did I Do"
"When I'm With You"
"Wilhelmina" 
"Without a Word of Warning"
"With My Eyes Wide Open, I'm Dreaming"
"You Do" 
"You Make Me Feel So Young"
"You Say the Sweetest Things Baby"
"You'll Never Know" – winner for 1943 Academy Award for Best Original Song, from Hello, Frisco, Hello

Original works for Broadway
Fast and Furious (1931) – revue – primary lyricist
Smiling Faces (1932) – musical – lyricist
Strike Me Pink (1933) – revue – contributing dialogue-writer

References

External links

Mack Gordon  in the Songwriters Hall of Fame

 Mack Gordon recordings at the Discography of American Historical Recordings.

1904 births
1959 deaths
Best Original Song Academy Award-winning songwriters
Jewish American songwriters
Vaudeville performers
Emigrants from the Russian Empire to the United States
20th-century American musicians
Jews from the Russian Empire
Burials at Home of Peace Cemetery
Glenn Miller Orchestra members
20th-century American Jews